Police Story (경찰관 - Gyeongchalgwan) is a 1979 South Korean film directed by Lee Doo-yong. It was chosen as Best Film at the Grand Bell Awards.

Plot
A melodrama about a man who chooses the career of a police officer in spite of his girlfriend's objection and social stigma. After he is injured in the line of duty, he and his girlfriend get married.

Cast
Jang Dong-he
Han So-ryong
Yu Ji-in
Moon Jung-suk
Do Kum-bong
Bang Su-il
Sin Mu-il
Kim Young-in
Han Kug-nam
Choe Jae-ho

Bibliography

References

External links

1979 drama films
South Korean drama films
Films directed by Lee Doo-yong
Best Picture Grand Bell Award winners
1970s Korean-language films